is a professional Japanese baseball player. He plays infielder for the Kintetsu Buffaloes.

External links

1958 births
Living people
People from Shizuoka (city)
Japanese baseball players
Nippon Professional Baseball infielders
Kintetsu Buffaloes players
Nippon Professional Baseball Rookie of the Year Award winners
Managers of baseball teams in Japan
Orix Buffaloes managers
Baseball people from Shizuoka Prefecture